The Tercio de Andaluces, also known as Batallón de Voluntarios Urbanos de los Cuatro Reinos de Andalucía, was a unit of Spanish militias of the city of Buenos Aires of the 19th century.

History 

The Tercio de Andaluces was created on October 8, 1806, after the first English Invasion of Buenos Aires. The battalion was composed of militiamen from Andalusia, and its Plana Mayor was integrated by the Commanders José Merelo, Agustín de Orta and Damián de Castro. 

The Andalusian Battalion counted eight companies of fifty-five men, toking part in the military actions against the English troops in the second of the invasions. In 1809, the officers of this Battalion were part of the troops that sustained the Viceroy Liniers against the conspiracy of Martín de Alzaga.

After the May Revolution, by decree of the Primera Junta, the Batallón de Voluntarios Urbanos de los Cuatro Reinos de Andalucía was merged with the Regimiento N° 5 de Infantería. Two companies of this regiment were sent to the First Upper Peru campaign, taking part in the Battle of Cotagaita.

References 

Regiments of Argentina
Military history of Argentina
Río de la Plata